Jamila Jaxaliyeva (Russian: Жамиля Магжановна Джаксалиева) (born 19 May 1990) is the first golfer from Kazakhstan to compete on a professional tour.

Biography 
Jaxaliyeva began playing golf at age 15 under the guidance of her father Magzhan Jaxaliyev, an engineer. She attended University of Geneva from 2009 to 2013 pursuing a degree in mathematics. After becoming the first player from Kazakhstan to qualify for Symetra Tour membership in 2014 she decided to keep her amateur status for most of the 2014 season. In July 2014 she eventually turned professional. In 2015, she finished 7th on the money list of the Canadian Women's Tour. Her best finish was 3rd at the Smiths Falls Golf and Country Club tournament. She became the first player from Kazakhstan to be featured in the Rolex Rankings after placing 3rd in the Azores Ladies Open, an LET Access event. Her 2016 season included a 2nd place finish at the 2016 North Shore Ladies Pro Am, an ALPG event and an 8th place finish at the Nordictrack Open de Strasbourg, an LET Access event.

Amateur wins
2009 Russian Women's Amateur
2011 Ukrainian Women's Amateur, Liechtenstein Women's Amateur, Championnat de la Ligue Rhône Alpes

References

Kazakhstani female golfers
1990 births
Living people